Hîncești is a district of Moldova, with the city of Hîncești as its administrative center. As of 1 January 2011, its population was 122,000.

History

The district has been inhabited since the Stone Age (40,000–30,000 BC). On the territory of the present localities Rusca and Anina many cemeteries and settlements pertaining to the native Getae culture (4th–3rd centuries BC) have been discovered. Localities with the earliest historical attestation are Secăreni, Leușeni, Lăpușna, and Ciuciuleni, which were first attested in the period 1420–1430. During the 15th–18th centuries, the district was part of Lăpușna. Tirgul Lăpușnei was the administrative center, headed by a pârcălab (governor). Lăpușna existed as a fair in the 14th century. A branch of the Moldovan Road passed by Lapusna, linking the economic centers of Transylvania and Poland to the North Pontic cities. The branch continued on over the Danube, in Dobruja, to Constantinople. Lăpușna Fair was a resting place for merchants, where they paid a small customs, besides the great customs from abroad. In 1489, Lăpușna was expressly recorded as a fair, thereby underlining its economic importance. After the conquest of Cetatea Albă and Chilia by the Turks, and Bugeac by Noha Tatars, the southern border of Moldova was moved farther north, closer to the region. Lăpușna has served as a resting place for many foreign travelers, officials, missionaries, ambassadors, and merchants. In 1812, after the Russo-Turkish War, the Russian Empire occupied the region of Basarabia, leading to an intense russification of the native population. In 1918, after the collapse of the Russian Empire, Bessarabia united with Romania. In this period (1918–1940 and 1941–1944), the district was part of the Lăpușna County. In 1940, after the Molotov-Ribbentrop Treaty, Basarabia was occupied by the USSR. In 1991, as a result of the proclamation of Independence of Moldova, the region became part of Lăpușna County (1991–2003), and in 2003 it became an administrative unit of Moldova.

Geography
Hîncești District is located in the central part of the Republic of Moldova. Neighboring districts include Nisporeni District to the northwest, Strășeni District to the northeast, Ialoveni District to the east, Cimișlia and Leova districts to the south, and the border with Romania on the river Prut to the west. The topography is predominantly hilly with heights between 100 and 350 m. The landscape of the district is divided into three areas: the forested hills of Codru, the forested and less hilly steppe, and the steppe of Prut. The Codru forests are characterized by very complicated terrain. From north to south, the territory is intersected by the Cogâlnic River and the Galbena River. The forested steppe is characterized by gentler topography. The area is intersected by the Lapusna River and the Sărata River, a tributary of the Prut. The Prut steppe zone is characterized by a flatter and less wooded landscape. This area is crossed by the river Călmățui, which in Turkish translates as "white matter". Erosional processes differ in each area.

Climate
The climate is moderate continental, and highly variable. The average annual air temperature is 10 °C. The average temperature in January is −4 °C, the absolute minimum is −30 to −32 °C, and in July the average temperature is 22 °C, with a maximum of 39 to 40 °C. Annual rainfall is 500–650 mm.

Fauna

The fauna are typical of Europe, and include mammals such as foxes, hedgehogs, deer, red deer, wild boar, wild cats, ermine, ferrets, and wolves and others. Birds include egrets, owls, crows, sparrows, starlings, and storks.

Flora
Forests occupy 18.5% of the district area, and consist of oaks, lindens, maples, beeches, acacias, and others. Other plants include bells, knotweeds, nettles, and wormwood.

Administrative subdivisions
Localities: 63
Administrative center: Hîncești
Cities: Hîncești
Villages: 24
Communes: 38

Demographics
As of 1 January 2012, the district population was 121,600, of which 13.9% was urban and 88.1% was rural. There were 1455 births (11.9 per 1000) and 1829 deaths (14.9 per 1000) in 2010, for a growth rate of −374 (−3.0 per 1000).

Ethnic groups

Footnote: * There is an ongoing controversy regarding the ethnic identification of Moldovans and Romanians.

Religion 
Christians – 98.6%
Orthodox Christians – 95.3%
Protestant – 3.3%
Baptists – 1.9%
Seventh-day Adventists 0.9%
Evangelicals – 0.3%
Pentecostals – 0.3%
Other – 0.9%
No Religion – 0.5%

Economy
Agriculture is the primary economic activity in the district. Products include wine, alcohol, bakery products, fruit, and sausages. All agricultural land is privately owned. There are 93,361 ha of agricultural land, including arable land (62.3%), vineyards (17.5%), and orchards (6.0%). Other products include shoes, clothes, furniture, and concrete building blocks.

Education
The district has 59 educational institutions, teaching 18,908 children, 350 students in the College of Construction, and 600 in various professional schools. Currently there are 1600 teachers.

Politics
The district traditionally supports right-wing parties, particularly the AEI. In the district, the PLDM had the highest percentage of votes of all of the districts of Moldova. Support for the PCRM has steadily declined.

During the last three elections support for the AEI had a 99.0% increase.

Elections

|-
!  style="background:#e9e9e9; text-align:center;" colspan="2"|Parties and coalitions
!  style="background:#e9e9e9; text-align:right;"|Votes
!  style="background:#e9e9e9; text-align:right;"|%
!  style="background:#e9e9e9; text-align:right;"|+/−
|-
| 
|align=left|Liberal Democratic Party of Moldova
|align="right"|26,555
|align="right"|51.09
|align="right"|+23.04
|-
| 
|align=left|Party of Communists of the Republic of Moldova
|align="right"|12,190
|align="right"|23.45
|align="right"|−9.55
|-
| 
|align=left|Democratic Party of Moldova
|align="right"|6,973
|align="right"|13.42
|align="right"|-3.06
|-
| 
|align=left|Liberal Party
|align="right"|3,551
|align="right"|6.83
|align="right"|−7.29
|-
| style="background:gray;"|
|align=left|Other Party
|align="right"|2,727
|align="right"|5.21
|align="right"|+2.01
|-
|  style="text-align:left; background:#e9e9e9;" colspan="2"|Total (turnout 56.20%)
|  style="text-align:right; width:30px; background:#e9e9e9;"|52,340
|  style="text-align:right; width:30px; background:#e9e9e9;"|100.00
|  style="text-align:right; width:30px; background:#e9e9e9;"|

Culture
The district is home to two museums, 77 works of art, and 13 bands.

Health
The district has two hospitals with 540 beds, a center for family doctors that has 25 family physician offices, 14 health centers, and 18 health points. There are 183 doctors and 472 medical staff and auxiliary.

Tourism

The council of the Romanian Vaslui County, the county councils of the Moldovan Leova and Hîncești districts, and the European Union (through the Phare program), have set up a program to promote tourism in these regions. The main tourist attractions of the Vaslui-Hîncești-Leova area are the medieval and early modern churches and monasteries, the Manuc Bei Hunting Palace and the Manuc–Mirzaian Manor Palace (similar to Manuc's Inn in Bucharest) in Hîncești, and the region's natural riches.

The district is home to the Hîncești Forest Landscape Reserve and two natural reserves for medicinal herbs (Sărata-Galbenă and Logănești).

Sister Communities 
On 1 December 2017, the district partnered with Greenfield, Massachusetts to form a "sister community".

References

 District population per year

External links

Vaslui-Turism.ro – Cultural Religious Itineraries – Tourism website for Hîncești District

 General description of Hîncești District
 Talk: Hîncești District
 Results of 2010 Parliamentary election

 
Districts of Moldova